The Troubadour is a nightclub, restaurant and pub located at 265 Old Brompton Road, Earls Court, London. Established in 1954, it is one of the oldest and last remaining nightclubs and coffee houses of its era in London.  It still offers live music seven days a week.

Financial troubles
The Troubadour was in danger of closure due to financial difficulties after being served with a noise abatement notice in 2012, related to use of the garden. In 2015, ownership was taken over by shareholder Giles McNamee, who has indicated there will be future investments to keep the club open.

Ownership
The Troubadour has had four proprietors since its opening:
1954–72, Michael Van Bloemen and Sheila Van Bloemen, founders of the venue
1972–98, Bruce Rogerson
1998–2015, Simon Thornhill and Susie Thornhill.
2015–present, Giles McNamee

Artists
The club has played host to a number of major artists in various stages of their careers. Among these have been:
Richard Harris – in early 1956 where he auditioned and rehearsed his own production of the Clifford Odets play Winter Journey (The Country Girl) while studying at the then nearby London Academy of Music and Dramatic Art (LAMDA). Richard Harris fell in love with his wife Elizabeth here as well. A newspaper review of the time
Charlie Watts – in summer 1961,
Bob Dylan – Christmas 1962, performing under the name Blind Boy Grunt.
Paul Simon - Played June 9th 1964 in London, at Troubadour 
Joni Mitchell – played in 1970
Robert Plant – likewise, Led Zeppelin had no official dates at the Troubadour
Lionel Grigson, along with other jazz musicians – including Spike Wells, Mick Pyne, Dave Gelly, Daryl Runswick, and Happy Williams – played regular Sunday afternoon gigs in the 1960s.
Sandy Denny – who was the subject of a 2008 tribute show held at the venue.
Martin Carthy – an influential figure in British traditional music
Davey Graham – an influential figures in the 1960s folk music revolution in England

References

External links
 – official site
Classic Cafés site

Clubs and societies in London
Music venues in London
1954 establishments in England
Folk music venues
Coffeehouses and cafés in London
Earls Court
Nightclubs in London
Concert halls in London
Jazz clubs in London
Pubs in London
Historic Rock and Roll Landmarks